Allan Fernando Reyes Poe (November 27, 1916 – October 23, 1951) was a Filipino actor and film director during the early era of cinema in the Philippines.

Poe was the father of Fernando Poe Jr., who later became a prominent actor and film industry icon. Prior to his son's rise to fame, he was known as Fernando Poe; he was later referred to as Fernando Poe Sr. to distinguish him from his son. He directed the first Darna film in 1951 before he died in the same year. As a leading man, he was often cast opposite Mona Lisa. He died because of Rabies.

Biography
Poe was born in San Carlos City, Pangasinan, and later had six children by his second wife,  Elizabeth "Bessie" Gatbonton Kelley (November 8, 1917 – March 2, 1999) of Pampanga: Elizabeth (Liz), Ronald Allan (Ronnie or FPJ), Fernando II (Andy), Genevieve (Jenny), Fredrick (Freddieboy), and Evangeline (Eva). Poe and Kelly were married in 1940 after their first two children were born. Actor Conrad Poe (CP), meanwhile, was his illegitimate son by actress Patricia Mijares.

The original spelling of his surname was Pou via his father, playwright Lorenzo Pou, a Catalan immigrant from Majorca in the Balearic Islands. Pou established a mining business in the Philippines and married a Pangasinense woman named Marta Reyes.

Poe graduated with the degree of Bachelor of Science in Chemistry from the University of the Philippines in 1935 and the degree of Doctor of Dental Medicine from the Philippine Dental College in 1942.

Poe died in 1951 while working on a film, after he permitted a puppy with rabies to lick his wound for believing of fast healing.

Selected filmography 
 Eseng ng Tondo (1937)
 Zamboanga (1937), also known as Fury in Paradise (UK)
 Giliw Ko (1939)
 Dawn of Freedom / Liwayway ng Kalayaan (1944)
 Dugo at Bayan (1946)
 Forbidden Women (1948)
 Darna (1951)

References

External links 

1916 births
1951 deaths
People from San Carlos, Pangasinan
Male actors from Pangasinan
Accidental deaths in the Philippines
Deaths due to dog attacks
Deaths from rabies
Filipino Roman Catholics
Filipino people of Catalan descent
Infectious disease deaths in the Philippines
Neurological disease deaths in the Philippines
Fernando
20th-century Filipino male actors
Burials at the Manila North Cemetery